Mousa Hatab (Arabic:موسى حطب) (born 12 April 1981) is an Emirati footballer. He currently plays as a defender.

External links

References

Emirati footballers
United Arab Emirates international footballers
1981 births
Living people
Ajman Club players
Sharjah FC players
Al-Ittihad Kalba SC players
Hatta Club players
Association football defenders
UAE First Division League players
UAE Pro League players
Emirati people of Baloch descent